John Smith (1656–1723) of Tedworth House, Hampshire, was an English politician who sat in the English and British House of Commons between 1678 and 1723. He served as Speaker and twice as Chancellor of the Exchequer.

Early life
Smith was the fourth, but only surviving, son of John Smith of Tedworth House, South Tidworth, Hampshire and his wife Mary Wright, daughter of Sir Edmund Wright, alderman, of London. His sister Anne married Sir Samuel Dashwood, MP and Lord Mayor of London. He matriculated at St John's College, Oxford, on 18 May 1672, aged 16, and was admitted at the Middle Temple in 1674.  His father died in 1690 and he succeeded to his estate, and then to the estate of his uncle Thomas Smith in 1692.

Career
Smith was a moderate Whig. He was first elected as Member of Parliament for Ludgershall at a contest in February 1679, but was defeated in the second election of the year in August.  He stood again in 1681, and there was a double return, which was not resolved before the end of that Parliament. In 1689 he was returned unopposed as MP for Ludgershall.

Smith was returned as MP for Bere Alston at a by-election on 15 December 1691. In 1694 he was appointed as a Lord of the Treasury and became a Privy Councillor on 23 May 1695. At the 1695 general election he was returned unopposed as MP for Andover. From 1695 to 1697 he was a Commissioner for Prize Appeals. He was returned unopposed again as MP for Andover at the 1698 general election. On 2 June 1699 he became Chancellor of the Exchequer. He was elected as MP for Andover again at the first general election of 1701, but although he was asked to continue as Chancellor, felt uncomfortable in a changed Parliament and resigned on 27 March 1701. In the second general election of 1701 and in that of 1702 he was re-elected MP for Andover. He was returned unopposed for Andover at the 1705 general election and was chosen as Speaker of the House of Commons in 1705. In 1706 he was a Commissioner for the Union with Scotland, and was the last Speaker of the House of Commons of England. After the Acts of Union 1707, he became the first Speaker of the new House of Commons of Great Britain. He was proposed for this position by his joint partner in the Company of Scotland, Francis Montgomerie of Giffen.

At the 1708 general election Smith was returned unopposed as MP for Andover, and subsequently gave up his position as Speaker when he was appointed Chancellor of the Exchequer again on 22 April 1708. He ceased to be Chancellor at the dissolution of Parliament on 11 August 1710, and was returned unopposed for Andover at the 1710 election. He was then appointed to the lucrative post of Teller of the Exchequer. He refused to stand for Parliament at the 1713 election, offended by suggestions that the ministry had him under control. His post of Teller was renewed in 1714 and he held it for the rest of his life.

Smith was returned as Member of Parliament for East Looe at the general elections in 1715 and 1722.

Personal life
He married Anne Steward, daughter of Sir Nicholas Steward, 1st Baronet, of Hartley Mauditt, Hampshire on 1 September 1679. Anne died in 1680 and he married secondly Anne Strickland, daughter of Sir Thomas Strickland of Boynton, Yorkshire by licence dated 7 November 1683.

Smith died on 2 October 1723 and was buried in the old church at South Tidworth. He and his second wife had four sons and three daughters, including Mary Smith and Anne Smith, Lady Grant. His son Thomas was also a Whig Member of Parliament.

References

Attribution
 

1650s births
1723 deaths
Alumni of St John's College, Oxford
Members of the Middle Temple
Chancellors of the Exchequer of England
Chancellors of the Exchequer of Great Britain
Speakers of the House of Commons of England
Speakers of the House of Commons of Great Britain
Members of the Privy Council of Great Britain
Place of birth missing
Members of the Parliament of Great Britain for English constituencies
English MPs 1679
English MPs 1689–1690
English MPs 1690–1695
English MPs 1695–1698
English MPs 1698–1700
English MPs 1701
English MPs 1701–1702
English MPs 1702–1705
English MPs 1705–1707
Members of the Parliament of Great Britain for constituencies in Cornwall
British MPs 1707–1708
British MPs 1708–1710
British MPs 1710–1713
British MPs 1715–1722
British MPs 1722–1727
Members of the Parliament of England for Bere Alston